Darío René Espínola Sevian (born September 14, 1967 in Paraguay), known as Darío Espínola, is a former Paraguayan footballer who played for clubs of Paraguay, Chile and Bolivia.

Teams
  Sol de América 1987–1990
  Cerro Corá 1991
  River Plate Asunción 1992
  Provincial Osorno 1993–1994
  Tembetary 1995–1996
  Guaraní 1996 Campeón Torneo Apertura
  Sportivo Luqueño 1997
  Cerro Porteño 1998 Campeón Torneo Clausura
  Everton 1998
  Oriente Petrolero 1999–2000
  3 de Febrero 2001
  Silvio Pettirossi 2002–2003
  Rubio Ñú 2004
  Resistencia 2005–2006

Notes

References
 

1967 births
Living people
Paraguayan footballers
Paraguayan expatriate footballers
Paraguay international footballers
Club Rubio Ñu footballers
Cerro Corá footballers
Club Guaraní players
Cerro Porteño players
Club Sol de América footballers
Silvio Pettirossi footballers
Oriente Petrolero players
Provincial Osorno footballers
Everton de Viña del Mar footballers
Primera B de Chile players
Chilean Primera División players
Expatriate footballers in Chile
Expatriate footballers in Bolivia
Association football goalkeepers